FC Klaipėda was a Lithuanian football club from the city of Klaipėda. The team was promoted to the A Lyga, the top-level league of Lithuania, for the 2010 season.

History
The club was founded in 2005 as FK Glestum and started playing on the third level. After two years, Glestum were promoted to the second level. Upon a takeover on 19 August 2009, the club was renamed FC Klaipėda. Soon thereafter, after an A Lyga restructurization, the club applied for a top-level licence and eventually was promoted. The club dissolved in 2012.

Players

Managers
 Rimantas Skersys (2010)
 Luis Antonio Fereira (2011–2012)

References

Defunct football clubs in Lithuania
2012 disestablishments in Lithuania
Association football clubs disestablished in 2012
Association football clubs established in 2005
2005 establishments in Lithuania